Mese is a comune (municipality) in the Province of Sondrio in the Italian region Lombardy, located about  north of Milan and about  northwest of Sondrio. 

Mese borders the following municipalities: Chiavenna, Gordona, Menarola, Prata Camportaccio, San Giacomo Filippo.

References

Cities and towns in Lombardy